Astele bularra, common name the necklace top shell, is a species of sea snail, a marine gastropod mollusk in the family Calliostomatidae.

Some authors place this taxon in the subgenus Astele (Astele)

Description
The size of the shell varies between 20 mm and 29 mm.

Distribution
This marine species occurs off Indo-Malaysia, the eastern coast of Australia and South Africa.

References

 Poppe G.T. (2004) Descriptions of spectacular new species from the Philippines (Gastropoda - Trochidae, Cypraeidae). Visaya 1(1): 4–19

External links
 

bularra
Gastropods described in 1961